San Bernardino Lagunas (also, Lagunas) is a village in Agua Prieta Municipality, Sonora, Mexico.

References

Populated places in Sonora